The Chernetidae are a family of pseudoscorpions with over 650 described species and 110 genera.

Subfamilies
Subfamilies and genera include:
Chernetinae

Goniochernetinae
 Calymmachernes Beier, 1954
 Conicochernes Beier, 1948
 Goniochernes Beier, 1932

Lamprochernetinae
 Allochernes Beier, 1932
 Anthrenochernes Lohmander, 1939
 Bipeltochernes Dashdamirov, 2005
 Lamprochernes Tömösváry, 1882
 Lasiochernes Beier, 1932
 Megachernes Beier, 1932
 Nudochernes Beier, 1935
 Pselaphochernes Beier, 1932

References 

 
Pseudoscorpion families